Posht Tang-e Shayengan (also Romanized as Posht Tang-e Shāyengān; also known as Posht Tang-e Shāygān) is a village in Dowlatabad Rural District, in the Central District of Ravansar County, Kermanshah Province, Iran. At the 2006 census, its population was 47, including 9 families.

References 

Populated places in Ravansar County